Irina Shevchenko, née Korotya (born 2 September 1975 in Frunze, Kyrgyz SSR) is a Russian hurdler.

Her personal best time is 12.67 seconds, achieved in July 2004 in Tula. She equalled this time in the 2004 Olympic semi final. Reaching the hurdles final at the 2004 Olympic Games, she fell after Perdita Felicien stumbled into her.

She did not compete during the 2000, 2002 or 2006 seasons.

She is coached by Valentin Maslakov and her husband Dmitriy Shevchenko.

International competitions

See also
List of European Athletics Championships medalists (women)
List of Olympic Games scandals and controversies

References

EAA profile

1975 births
Living people
Sportspeople from Bishkek
Russian female hurdlers
Olympic female hurdlers
Olympic athletes of Russia
Athletes (track and field) at the 2004 Summer Olympics
World Athletics Championships athletes for Russia
European Athletics Championships medalists
Russian Athletics Championships winners
Universiade medalists in athletics (track and field)
Universiade silver medalists for Russia